Shakugan no Shana is a Japanese light novel series written by Yashichiro Takahashi with accompanying illustrations drawn by Noizi Ito. The series follows Yuji Sakai, an ordinary Japanese high school boy who inadvertently becomes involved in a perpetual war between forces of balance and imbalance in existence. In the process, he befriends the title character: a fighter for the balancing force, whom he takes to calling "Shana". The series covers 26 novels published between November 9, 2002 and November 10, 2012 under ASCII Media Works' Dengeki Bunko imprint. Viz Media once published the first two volumes in English, although the rights to the series have been dropped, thus leaving them out of print.


Volume list

Main series

Short story collections

References

External links
  
 Shakugan no Shana at ASCII Media Works 

Shakugan no Shana
Science fiction novel series
Light novels